Gunnar Anders Landelius (20 March 1918 – 8 April 2000) was a Swedish ice hockey, football and bandy player, known for representing Hammarby IF in all three sports. He competed in the hockey tournament at the 1948 Winter Olympics.

Athletic career

Ice hockey
Born and raised in Stockholm, Landelius started to play ice hockey with local club IK Nordia as a youngster. In 1938–39, he made his debut for Hammarby IF in Svenska Serien, the domestic top division. The club went on to win the league in an undefeated season, winning all seven matches, but no Swedish champion was crowned due to cold weather.

Landelius won three Swedish championships – in 1942, 1943 and 1945 – with Hammarby IF. In total, he played 181 games for Hammarby IF and scored 48 goals.

Due to World War II, Landelius only played 21 international games with the Swedish national team. Most notably, he was voted as the best defenceman in the 1947 World Championships as his country won the silver medal. He also competed in the 1948 Winter Olympics in St. Moritz, where Sweden finished in fourth place.

Football
In 1940, at age 22, Landelius made his debut for Hammarby IF in Division 2, Sweden's second highest football league. Playing as a forward, he went on to score 10 goals in 25 league games for the club in six seasons, being used sparingly as an emergency player, as the club unsuccessfully pushed for a promotion to Allsvenskan.

Bandy
Landelius also played bandy with Hammarby IF. In 1941, he was called up to the Sweden B team to a game against Finland. Landelius competed with the club in Allsvenskan, the highest division, for three seasons in 1944, 1946 and 1952.

References

External links
 

1918 births
2000 deaths
Hammarby Fotboll players
Hammarby IF Bandy players
Ice hockey players at the 1948 Winter Olympics
Olympic ice hockey players of Sweden
Ice hockey people from Stockholm
Swedish bandy players
Swedish footballers
Swedish ice hockey players
Association football forwards